The winged, divine horse Pegasus has been a prominent figure in modern popular culture.

Art

Pegasus, an 1888 sculpture that depicts the creature being tamed by Bellerophon, is the most famous work of French sculptor Émile Louis Picault, of which only 800 were made.
 Statues of Pegasus, Mexico City

Corporate and commercial uses
Pegasus was chosen for the academic seal of the University of Central Florida, in 1963, by its first president, Dr. Charles Millican, who co-designed it.
The Pegasus logo has been used for over 29 years by Courier Company Pegasus Express Ltd, and is seen on all vehicles and trailers, and depots in Scotland and England.
Pegasus has been the symbol of the Mobil brand of gas and oil, marketed by the Exxon Mobil Corporation, since the 1930s and, more recently, FBR Capital Markets, an investment bank based in Arlington, Virginia. As such, it has also been a symbol of Dallas, Texas, gracing its skyline atop the Magnolia building and in Pegasus Plaza.
 Pegasus appears prominently in the logo of UB Group, an Indian business conglomerate.
Pegasus is the name of an air-launched vehicle that carries satellites to orbit.
Pegaso was a Spanish maker of trucks, buses and sport cars, although its logo portrayed the silhouette of a wingless, leaping horse. 
The Poetry Foundation also uses Pegasus as its logo.
The Buell Motorcycle Company uses Pegasus as a visual branding element.
Reader's Digest also has a Pegasus logo.
A Pegasus is the emblem of the Honourable Society of the Inner Temple, which names its bar the Pegasus. Pegasus is the University of Exeter's Classics and Ancient History Departmental journal. It has had many entries from notable Classicists as well as two articles from J. K. Rowling, a former student of the University's Classics and Ancient History Department.
It was featured in the cover of Fleetwood Mac's single "Family Man".
Pegasus was featured on the covers of three albums by The Steve Miller Band: Book of Dreams in 1977, Greatest Hits 1974-78, and Living in the 20th Century in 1986. 
The Taiwanese company Asustek (manufacturer of the Asus brand computer, networking and consumer products) took its name from the creature, omitting the first three letters in order for the company to appear first in telephone listings. Likewise, its former fabrication subsidiary Pegatron took the first four letters from the name of the creature. 
Mascot of the Kentucky Derby Festival, a community celebration leading up to the Run for the Roses (aka: the Kentucky Derby) in Louisville, Kentucky, USA.
Turkish Pegasus Airlines uses the emblem  of Pegasus, and Pegasus also appears in the turbines of all Air France aircraft.
PEGASYS (Hoffmann–La Roche) for the treatment of hepatitis C, is a once-a-week injection that works to reduce the amount of hepatitis C virus in the body.
Pegasus is the mascot of TriStar Pictures.
Pegasus is also the mascot of Metropolitan Filmexport.
Pegasus is the name of a medevac helicopter based at the University of Virginia Medical Center. Pegasus transports critically injured patients within  of Charlottesville, Virginia. The name was chosen because it was different from most other medevac programs, and there are stories of Pegasus carrying wounded soldiers from battle.
Pegasus is also featured on the coat of arms of Robinson College, part of the University of Cambridge in Cambridge, England. The University of Strathclyde, in Glasgow Scotland, uses an online service called PEGASUS (Portal Engine Giving Access To Strathclyde University Systems) to provide its students with crucial information. 
Nike Inc. has produced a brand of running shoe named the Air Pegasus.
Pegasus Mail is the name of an email client.
A pegasus was used as the Pontiac Fiero's emblem.
Middle Tennessee State University's Mascot "Lightning" is based on Pegasus.

Films
A Pegasus is used in the 1932 Oswald the Lucky Rabbit cartoon The Winged Horse.

Pegasus has appeared in several films, including the animated films Fantasia, Hercules, and Barbie and the Magic of Pegasus along with the stop motion film Clash of the Titans, its remake Clash of the Titans and, as a name only, in Johnny English and its sequels Johnny English Reborn and Johnny English Strikes Again.

In Disney's Fantasia, Pegasi are featured during the visualized "Pastoral Symphony" segment, along with other mythical creatures including unicorns and centaurs and in Hercules he is the winged horse sidekick and friend to Hercules, the main character. In Clash of the Titans, Pegasus is captured by Perseus before Perseus visits and kills Medusa the Gorgon. This version, changes the method of Pegasus' birth - although no further details are given, save a comment from Zeus that Pegasus is the sole surviving winged horse from a herd of the creatures, the rest killed by Thetis' son, Calibos. In Barbie and the Magic of Pegasus, Pegasus is the winged horse who helps Princess Annika..  In the film Johnny English, starring Rowan Atkinson, Pegasus, played by Tim Pigott-Smith, is the codename of the head of MI7; in the sequel, Johnny English Reborn, the head of the organisation is now a woman, played by Gillian Anderson, who also uses the codename Pegasus (possibly in a nod to the James Bond film series, in which M was traditionally played by a man but was then played by Judi Dench).  A pegasus can be seen on the TriStar logo. A pegasus can also be seen on the Metropolitan Filmexport logo.

Pegasus (or possibly more than one) has appeared in two Marvel Cinematic Universe films. During a flashback sequence in Thor: Ragnarok, Valkyrie is briefly seen riding one. In Avengers: Endgame, she rides one again in the final battle against Thanos. It is not clear whether this is the same individual horse seen in the earlier film.

Pegasus is also the name of a secret military project in the MCU. The project was a cover story for a faster-than-light drive built using Kree technology. The ship crashes, and Carol Danvers destroys the engine to prevent the Skrulls from salvaging it. Unknown to Carol, the Pegasus engine was powered by the Tessaract. She absorbed the energy of the explosion and gained superpowers from it, eventually becoming Captain Marvel.

A Pegasus is seen in Jumanji The Next Level as a flying horse avatar named Cyclone.

Television
 In the anime and manga series One Piece, during the Skypiea arc, Pierre, a bird of Gan Fall could transform into a horse and a horse bird hybrid due to eating a devil fruit, which give the users of devil fruits enormous power but also a prime weakness to water.
 Pegasus has been featured in Stargate Atlantis as a galaxy.
 Both versions of Battlestar Galactica included the Battlestar Pegasus, which survived the fall of the Twelve Colonies of Kobol. 
In Long Ago and Far Away, season 3 (1991), episode titled "Pegasus, the Flying Horse," with voices by Mia Farrow. 
 In the Japanese anime Digimon Adventure 02, Patamon can digivolve into Pegasusmon using the Digi-Egg of Hope. 
 In the anime Beyblade: Metal Fusion, the main protagonist Gingka Hagane uses the powerful bit-beast Pegasus. 
 In the anime series Gundam, one of the main spaceships, White Base, is a Pegasus-class battle ship.
 In the anime Fairy Tail one of the main guilds is called Blue Pegasus, the guild's mark represents the name of the guild.    
 In Sailor Moon SuperS, the spirit of Helios, the keeper of the Golden Crystal, disguises himself as a Pegasus. Drawing on the metaphor of inspiration, he flees to live in a particular character's 'dream mirror', a literal reflection of a character's dreams and goals. 
In the anime Yu-Gi-Oh!, the main antagonist of the first season (and creator of the card game Duel Monsters) is a man named Maximillion Pegasus. 
 In Dengeki Sentai Changeman, Yuma Ozora's motif is a pegasus.
 In Gosei Sentai Dairanger, Shoji of the Heavenly Gravity Star's motif is a pegasus.
 Pegasus frequently appears in the 1960s cartoon The Mighty Hercules, as the winged steed of the titular character.
 In Fate/Stay Night, Pegasus is the Mythical Beast that is used by the Servant Rider when she uses one of her Noble Phantasms, Bellerophon.  As a further reference to the original myth where it was born from the blood of the decapitated Medusa, Rider (whose true identity was Medusa) first summoned the Pegasus by stabbing herself through the neck.
 The Hasbro owned toy line My Little Pony includes ponies that are based on Pegasus. In the first animated special Rescue at Midnight Castle the pony Firefly is a pegasus pony. In the animated TV series My Little Pony: Friendship Is Magic, pegasus ponies are one of three distinct species of ponies featured (unicorns and earth ponies being the other two). Two of the main characters Rainbow Dash and Fluttershy are pegasus ponies.
 The Pegasus is a recurring motif in the manga and anime Saint Seiya. In this series, the main character, Seiya, becomes the Pegasus Saint. Also, the show's theme song is titled "Pegasus Fantasy" by the Japanese group Make-Up.
 The titular character and protagonist of the 2000 Kamen Rider Series, Kamen Rider Kuuga can use a green-colored form known as "Pegasus Form".
 Kamen Rider Blades of the 2020 Kamen Rider Series, Kamen Rider Saber has a Pegasus-based Wonder Ridebook compatible with his water-based weapon.

Theatre
In the Broadway production of Xanadu, protagonist Kira rides on Pegasus to Mount Olympus during the number "Suspended in Time."

Written works
Authors include Julia Golding, in her Companions Quartet, including Secret of the Sirens, The Gorgon's Gaze, Mines of the Minotaur and The Chimera's Curse; and Anne McCaffrey, who wrote a series of books, To Ride Pegasus, Pegasus in Flight, and Pegasus in Space.
In the anime/manga of Yu-Gi-Oh!, the creator of the Duel Monsters card game was named Pegasus J. Crawford (Maximillion Pegasus in the dub and English manga). Also, there is a Duel Monster called Firewing Pegasus, and another called Sapphire Pegasus. In the classic anime/manga Saint Seiya, the Pegasus is the title character's destined constellation, and Seiya dons an ancient Greek armor in the form of the winged horse.
Pegasus is the title character in the Pegasus book series written by Kate O'Hearn.
Frequently mentioned in Rick Riordan Percy Jackson and the Olympians and The Heroes of Olympus series, Pegasus finally appears in the final book, The Blood of Olympus, as the father of pegasi, among them Percy Jackson's friend, Blackjack.
A pegasus is depicted living with Wonder Woman aboard the Wonderdome, and would make recurring appearances aiding her in her battle against the Gorgons and the Underworld.
In Monster Musume, Pegasuses are a subspecies of centaurs with wings on their equine half and a minor character named Pegasania belongs to this group.

Video games
In the video game God of War II, the protagonist Kratos is bidden by Gaia (mother of earth), the mother of the Titans, to find the Sisters of Fate in order to change his past. She gives Kratos the aid of a Fire Pegasus to traverse the distance to the Island of Creation, where the Fates' temple is located.
Pegasus is the Poseidon captured victim in Heracles: Battle With The Gods on the Nintendo DS. Pegasus is freed and reunited with Heracles after Poseidon's defeat.
In multiple games in the Fire Emblem series, pegasi are mounted by knights and called Pegasus knights, or Falcon Knights in their upgraded form. In Fire Emblem Awakening, the class Dark Flier, which certain characters ride on a black Pegasus, is introduced.
In the computer game Age of Mythology, Pegasus appears in game as a flying scout unit.
Pegasus appears in the final scene of the 2600 game No Escape.
Heroes of Might and Magic 3 features Pegasi being riddened by female elves as recruitable troops from the Rampart town.
In the video game Kingdom Hearts II, the protagonist, Sora, duels the Hydra from the back of Pegasus.
In Quest for Glory V: Dragon Fire the Hero has to obtain some Pegasus feathers for the main quest.
In the video game Mega Man Star Force, one of the three versions, as well as the featured "Satellite Admin" that the player fights and obtains the power of, is named Pegasus, and resembles one.
In Heroes of the Storm, playable heroes can use pegasi as mounts to move quickly through the battleground.
The time machine in the Journeyman Project series is called the Pegasus Temporal Catapult, or simply the Pegasus Device.
In Inazuma Eleven, one of the hissatsu techniques is called "Pegasus Shot" and involves summoning a blue Pegasus. A combination version involving three users is called "Tri-Pegasus", where a large white Pegasus is summoned. 
Inazuma Eleven's follow up, Inazuma Eleven GO, and its two sequels, feature protagonist Matsukaze Tenma whose personality is based on Pegasus. His keshin, a magical deity which can be summoned by its user, is a "Majin Pegasus". The evolved version of his soul, an ability that lets the user transform into an animal, is Pegasus. The name "Tenma" when written in kanji translates to "heavenly horse".
In Assassin's Creed Odyssey, the player can purchase a cosmetic skin for their horse that turns it into Pegasus.
In Fate/stay night, the Servant Rider can summon a pegasus that she rides with her Noble Phantasm Bellerophon.
In Call of Duty: Black Ops 4, in the Zombies map Ancient Evil, the player can ride Pegasus to the "dark side" of the ancient Greek city of Delphi.

Popular music 

 "Pegasus" by The Allman Brothers Band
 "Pegasus" by System F
 "Pegasus", a California based rock band, 1977–1986, with Tedd Armstrong, Steve  Caton, James Bender
 "Pegasus" by The Hollies
 "Flying Red Horse" by John Gorka
 "Pegasus" by Ulrich Roth
 "I am Pegasus" by Ross Ryan
 "Neon Pegasus" by Parry Gripp
 "Perplexing Pegasus" by Rae Sremmurd

Sport 
"Wild Pegasus" was the ring named used by professional wrestler Chris Benoit during his time wrestling in Japan. Benoit won the Super J-Cup while competing under this name.
Fusaichi Pegasus, a racehorse, won the 2000 Kentucky Derby.

References